Price Lake is located in North Cascades National Park, in the U. S. state of Washington. Price Lake was formed by the retreat of Price Glacier, which descends from the north slopes of Mount Shuksan. Price Glacier is broken into an upper and lower section and the lower section sometimes calves small icebergs into Price Lake.

References

Lakes of Washington (state)
North Cascades National Park
Lakes of Whatcom County, Washington